RTVA may refer to the following:
 Ràdio i Televisió d'Andorra, the public service broadcaster of the Principality of Andorra
 Radio y Televisión de Andalucía, the public service broadcaster of Andalucía, Spain